Robert Thomas Synnott (September 27, 1912 – November 19, 1985) was an American professional basketball and minor league baseball player. He played for dozens of independent and professional basketball teams in the 1930s and 1940s, including stops in the Metropolitan Basketball League, American Basketball League, New York State Professional Basketball League, and National Basketball League (NBL). In the NBL, Synnott averaged 2.4 points per game for his career and also won a league championship in 1944–45 with the Fort Wayne Zollner Pistons.

Synnott played two seasons of minor league baseball for the Cumberland Colts in the Middle Atlantic League (1931, 1932). A pitcher, he recorded 11 wins and 14 losses with a 4.20 earned run average.

References

1912 births
1985 deaths
American Basketball League (1925–1955) players
American men's basketball players
Baseball players from New York (state)
Basketball players from New York City
Centers (basketball)
Chicago American Gears players
Cumberland Colts players
Forwards (basketball)
Fort Wayne Zollner Pistons players
Original Celtics players
Syracuse Nationals players
Wilkes-Barre Barons players